Banana production in Ecuador is important to the national economy. Ecuador is one of the world's top banana producers, ranked 5th with an annual production of 8 million tonnes (6% of world production) as of 2011. The country exports more than 4 million tonnes annually. The crop is mostly grown on private plantations which sell their crop to national and international companies such as Chiquita, Del Monte, Dole, and Noboa. and others.

History

Production of bananas began in Ecuador in 1910. However, the industry did not experience a boom until 1948, when the government of President Galo Plaza began issuing agricultural credits, tariffs, building ports and a highway on the coast, and making efforts towards pest control.

At its peak in the mid-1950s, Ecuador was the largest banana producer in the world. In 1954, five companies including Standard Fruit, United Fruit, and Noboa handled 80 percent of Ecuador's banana exports. A decade later, there were 3,000 banana farms in the country, each averaging approximately 158 acres in size. As of 1960, bananas exported from Ecuador accounted for 25 percent of the world's production, out-producing all of the Central American countries.

In the late 1950s, a fungal disease called Panama disease caused huge losses to the banana crop. During the 1960s agrarian reform caused fragmentation of land holdings and multinational companies closed down due to labour trouble. Large landholders lost the advantage and as a result very large numbers of smaller non union plantations came to be established under local producers. During this period Central American countries introduced a new variety known as Cavendish bananas, which was a setback to Ecuador as its banana production was affected. However, Dole ensured that Ecuador's export share in the world market did not fall below 15%.

In 1974, Ecuador became a member of the Union of Banana Exporting Countries in an attempt to bargain for better prices. The UEB proposal of an export tax did not succeed in Ecuador, however. In 1975 the UEB collapsed after what became known as "bananagate", bribery of the banana trade monopoly consisting of the three US companies (United Fruit, Standard Fruit, and the Del Monte Corporation).

Eventually, the Black sigatoka, a banana disease destroying much of banana production in Central American countries and Colombia, as well as a levy of export tax, and political unrest in Central America, came to Ecuador's advantage. The Standard Fruit Company and Del Monte Fresh Produce Company decided to make Ecuador the primary supplier of bananas in the 1970s. Some 147,909 hectares were dedicated to production, 99 percent of which were in the three provinces of Oro, Guayas, and Los Ríos in the lowlands of the Pacific coast, with a tropical climate and rich soil conditions.

During the 1980s and 1990s in Ecuador, the economic policy of foreign trade was modified to comply to the international trade regime. This boosted banana exports, accounting for 21.1 per cent of total exports and 64.7 per cent of all agricultural exports during the decade of the 1990s. In 1998, there were 4,941 banana planters employing a workforce of 98,000. In 1999 Dole established a new loading terminal at Bananapuerto in 1999.

In 2003 the Food and Agriculture Organization reported that the country's banana workers received lower wages than banana workers in all other Latin American banana-exporting nations. A study conducted three years earlier stated that the country's banana worker's average monthly wage was US$56.

In 2012, Ecuador reported losses of $600 million due to the Black sigatoka fungus, with 40% (85,000 hectares) of the country's banana plantations affected by it.

Production

Production of banana involves direct adoption of natural resources and labour force. Its dependence, as an agricultural industry, to variation in international prices is high. World consumption standards, trade and environmental regulations, sanctions applied by Ecuador's principal buyers, and the opinions of civil society also have a major bearing on its production. Its commercial production is also influenced by the trade policy of the European Union.

As of 2000, Ecuador's export of bananas (the second dominant export item after crude oil) was 3,993,968 metric tons which accounted for 28% of the world's production of 14,155,222 metric tons, making up 5 percent of its GDP. Of this export, bananas were primarily destined for the United States, the largest importer (24 percent), followed by the European Union accounting for 17 percent. However, the European Union, is insistent on signing a trade deal which Ecuador has so far refused to sign. This has created fear among the farming community in Ecuador for their livelihoods.

Although there are 300 varieties of bananas grown in Ecuador, the widely grown variety is Cavendish, which can be grown at high densities but are susceptible to pest, mould and other diseases, and spraying the plant with chemicals and pesticides is an essential requirement to maintain yield levels.

Bananas are harvested almost every week of the year. The plant growth begins after a plant is cut and a new one sprouts from the root of parent plant. It becomes fruit bearing one year later. Harvested bananas are transported to destinations by truck every week.

The cultivation process involves removal of weeds, applying insecticides, covering the fruits with plastics to prevent loss due to close contact, also enclosing the bananas with plastic bags filled with insecticide, protecting plant stocks by covering them with strips of plastic coated with insecticide, removal of yellow and dead leaves, and providing support by propping up the plants with wooden stakes. The growth phases are monitored by tying coloured bands to the stalks. Thus, there are three stages of monitoring which are: harvesting fruit-laden stalks, transporting them to the packing plant, cutting the remaining stems after harvest.

Cuisine
The country's cuisine includes a variety of different banana types such as oritos (sweet baby bananas): yellow eating bananas which are short, fat and very sweet. A related fruit, plantains or plátanos (pronounced "PLAH-ta-nohs"), are also grown extensively in Ecuador, and are usually cooked for eating, both when green and at various stages of ripening. In the coastal areas, a popular side dish served is Patacones, or fried plantains. Plantains are eaten in deep fried form or baked or boiled and used in a wide variety of dishes. The green variety is unripe and is known as verde, the Spanish word for green. When they are ripe they turn yellow and then black . Green plantains are commonly cut into thin slices and deep fried. These are known as chifles and are very popular, much like potato chips, used to accompany ceviches and many other dishes; the maqueño type is especially good for chifles. Viche is a soup containing banana, calamari, conch, crab, crawfish, fish, and peanuts.

Environmental and humanitarian concerns

There are several issues related to the adverse environmental impact due to production of bananas. One issue is of waste management, particularly of plastic bags that are tied to the plants and the fruits during the stages of its growth. Of these bags, the blue colour bags are reported to have toxic effect of Chlorpyrifos, which are not controlled and found strewn all over the place. Aerial spraying of insecticides takes place with about 25 such cycles of spraying in a year. This is a major issue as the people both in the banana production process as in the spraying process are exposed to the toxic effects of such spraying. Not only the plantation but also houses, animals and water bodies are affected by the spray. Testing of water samples from affected areas has revealed calixin and also organophosphates. These toxics can lead to toxicant-induced loss of tolerance (TILT). While aerial spraying is one aspect of the problem manual spraying has much greater impact in the field as the task is sublet to contractors whose employees performing the task are not employed by the plantation and they use highly toxic products such as Mocap (Ethoprophos), and they usually work without any protective cover.

A framework known as the Corporate Social Responsibility (CSR) programme has been introduced to address the above issues but its effectiveness has been seriously questioned. Hence, an alternative suggestion made by FAO to address the issues of environmental effects is to evolve a "Health, Safety & Environment Programme" for the whole banana industry, based on trade union proposals, building common priorities and strategies with other stakeholders and implementing concerted strategies to make progressive changes to improve the seriously deteriorated situation facing workers.

Exposure to toxic pesticides is a threat to all workers including children as young as 8 years of age. According to the Human Rights Watch, Ecuador has 'violated its duty to respect, protect, and promote workers' rights to organize, as required by the International Covenant on Civil and Political Rights, the ILO Convention concerning Freedom of Association and Protection of the Right to Organise, and the ILO Convention concerning the Right to Organise and Collective Bargaining.
In 2013, the U.S. Department of Labor reported that 2.7% of children aged 5 to 14 are working children and that 71% of them continue to be engaged in child labor in the agricultural sector, namely in the production of bananas. In December 2014 and as far as Ecuador is concerned, bananas are mentioned in the List of Goods Produced by Child Labor or Forced Labor.

References

Banana production
Economy of Ecuador
Agriculture in Ecuador